The 2011 Bristol City Council elections were held on Thursday 5 May 2011, for 24 seats, that being one third of the total number of councillors. The Liberal Democrats, who had won overall control of the council in 2009 and increased their majority in 2010, experienced a drop in support and lost 5 seats; 4 to the Labour Party and 1 to the Green Party, which gained its second ever council seat in Bristol. This meant that the Lib Dems no longer had a majority on the council. However, they continued to run the council, relying on opposition groups to vote through any proposal.

Ward results

Ashley

Bedminster

Bishopsworth

Brislington East

Brislington West

Cabot

Clifton

Clifton East

Cotham

Easton

Eastville

Filwood

Frome Vale

Hartcliffe

Hengrove

Hillfields

Knowle

Lawrence Hill

Southville

St George East

St George West

Stockwood

Whitchurch Park

Windmill Hill

Notes

References

2011 English local elections
2011
2010s in Bristol